Bristol is a former town in Morgan County, in the U.S. state of Ohio. The GNIS classifies it as a populated place.

History
Bristol was platted in 1831, and named for its location within Bristol Township.  A post office called Bristol was established in 1834, and remained in operation until 1915.

References

Unincorporated communities in Morgan County, Ohio
Unincorporated communities in Ohio
1831 establishments in Ohio